I Remember You may refer to:

Music

Albums 
 I Remember You..., a 1980 album by Karin Krog, Warne Marsh and Red Mitchell
 I Remember You (Brian McKnight album), 1995
 I Remember You (Jo Stafford album), 2002
 I Remember You (Templeton Thompson album), 2003
 I Remember You (Hank Jones album), 1977
 I Remember You (John Hicks album), 2009

Songs 
 "I Remember You" (1941 song)
 "I Remember You", cover by Björk from Venus as a Boy
 "I Remember You" (Denine song)
 "I Remember You" (Skid Row song), 1989
 "I Remember You" (Yui song), 2006
 "I Remember You", by Bobby Vinton from Bobby Vinton Sings the Big Ones
 "I Remember You", by Kris Allen from Letting You In
 "I Remember You", by Ramones from Leave Home
 "I Remember You", by Roxette from Joyride
 "I Remember You", by Tom Chaplin from The Wave

Other uses 
 "I Remember You" (Adventure Time)
 I Remember You (2015 film), a 2015 American film
 I Remember You (2017 film), a 2017 Icelandic film
 I Remember You, a 2015 South Korean television series

See also 
 I Will Remember You (disambiguation)